Schimke syndrome is a rare autosomal recessive disorder.

The disorder was first described in 1971 by Schilmke.

Diagnosis 
Most people with this disorder are diagnosed at age 6.

Tests for mutations in the SMARCAL1 can confirm the diagnosis.

Prevalence 

The exact prevalence is unknown but is said to occur in 1 in a million births in North America.
The disorder is said to occur in 1 in 1 million or 1 in 3 million people in North America.

References 

Autosomal recessive disorders